John Eggett (19 April 1874 − 1943) was an English footballer who played as a goalkeeper with Doncaster Rovers in the Football League and Tottenham Hotspur in the Southern League.

Playing career

Doncaster Rovers
Hailing from Wisbech, Cambridgeshire, he played for Walsoken Victory and Wisbech Town before being scouted and signed by Doncaster Rovers in 1894. Playing against Rotherham Town in a second round FA Cup tie in November 1895, he was fouled by an opposing forward and kicked him in retaliation. Eggett was sent off and later banned for six weeks, whilst Doncaster lost the home game 7–0. In December 1896, he missed the train to an away match at Wellingborough Town, but Rovers still managed to win despite starting the match with only 10 men.

He played every game in their debut season in the Football League in 1901, and missed only one game the following season. He made 70 Football League and FA Cup appearances for Rovers, plus many more in the Midland League over several seasons.

After they were relegated in 1903, he moved first to Woolwich Arsenal and then to West Ham United in January 1904, but made no first team appearances for either.

Tottenham Hotspur
In 1904, he was signed by Southern League club Tottenham Hotspur where he stayed for 3 seasons. In his first season at Spurs, he kept 24 out of 27 clean sheets, and 22 out of 34 in his second.

Croydon Common
In 1907, Eggett moved to Croydon Common for one season, playing in their first ever League and Cup matches. He subsequently moved back north to play for Goole Town in 1908.

Personal life
It is reported that his death towards the end of 1943 in Doncaster was at a charity event.

Honours
Doncaster Rovers
 Midland League champions: 1896–97, 1898–99
 Midland League runners up: 1900–01
 Yorkshire League runners up: 1898–99

References

1874 births
1943 deaths
People from Wisbech
English footballers
Association football goalkeepers
Doncaster Rovers F.C. players
Tottenham Hotspur F.C. players
Croydon Common F.C. players
Goole Town F.C. players
English Football League players
Southern Football League players